Rhythm & Romance may refer to:

 Rhythm & Romance (Rosanne Cash album), 1985
 Rhythm & Romance (Kenny G album), 2008
 Rhythm & Romance (The System album), 1989